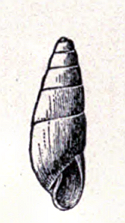
- Petitilla crosseana

Scientific classification
- Kingdom: Animalia
- Phylum: Mollusca
- Class: Gastropoda
- Family: Pyramidellidae
- Genus: Petitilla; Wise, 1997

Type species
- Petitilla crosseana Dall, W.H., 1885

Synonyms
- Petitella Wise, 1996 (preoccupied)

= Petitilla =

Genus of gastropods

Petitilla is a genus of sea snails, marine gastropod mollusks in the family Pyramidellidae, the pyrams and their allies.

== Species ==
Species within the genus Petitilla include:

- Petitilla crosseana (Dall, 1885)
