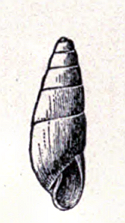
- Drawing of a shell of Petitilla crosseana

Scientific classification
- Kingdom: Animalia
- Phylum: Mollusca
- Class: Gastropoda
- Family: Pyramidellidae
- Genus: Petitilla
- Species: P. crosseana

Binomial name
- Petitilla crosseana (Dall, 1885)

Synonyms
- Petitilla crosseana bahamensis Dall, W.H., 1894; Sayella crosseana Dall, 1885

= Petitilla crosseana =

Species of gastropod

Petitilla crosseana is a species of sea snail, a marine gastropod mollusk in the family Pyramidellidae, the pyrams and their allies.

== Description ==
The shell grows to a length of 3 mm.

== Distribution ==
This species occurs in the following locations:

- Caribbean Sea
- Gulf of Mexico, Florida
- Mexico
- Atlantic Ocean : Bahamas, South Carolina
